HMS Euryalus was a fourth-rate wooden-hulled screw frigate of the Royal Navy, with a  steam engine that could make over . She was launched at Chatham in 1853, was 212 feet long, displaced 3,125 tons and had a complement of 515 (this varied slightly as the Naval Standards varied). At the time of the Bombardment of Kagoshima she carried 35 guns, not counting approximately 16 carronades. Seventeen of her guns were breech-loading Armstrong guns. She carried 230 tons of coal, and provisions for about three months, together with over 70 tons of shot and shell.

Service history
In December 1853, G. Ramsay was appointed captain. The ship served in the Baltic Campaign in 1854–1855.

On 2 April 1855 she gave HMS Imperieuse a tow, after the ship had run aground; the previous day, off the Reefness Lighthouse (Røsnæs lighthouse) in Kalundborg, Denmark.

As part of the Anglo-French fleet, she took part in the bombardment of Sveaborg (now Suomenlinna, Finland) on 7–9 August 1855.

Under the command of J. W. Tarleton, she served in the Mediterranean in 1858. The same year Prince Alfred was appointed to the ship as a midshipman. In 1860, the ship visited the Cape of Good Hope.

Euryalus arrived at Yokohama on 15 September 1862, the day following the Namamugi Incident, a samurai assault on British nationals on the outskirts of the treaty port that led to a major breakdown in Anglo-Japanese relations. In an effort to enforce reparations from the Satsuma Domain, Euryalus served as Admiral Sir Augustus Kuper's flagship during the bombardment of Kagoshima on 16 August 1863. During the bombardment of Kagoshima the Captain of Euryalus, John James Steven Josling, was killed, as was his second-in-command, Commander Edward Wilmot, both decapitated by the same cannonball. Eight other members of the crew also died in the action, their names all commemorated on a memorial in the former British Consulate building in Yokohama.

Euryalus also participated in the bombardment of Shimonoseki in September 1864. The captain and commander of the ship at Shimonoseki was Captain John Hobhouse Inglis Alexander, who was severely wounded in the ankle as he led the assault on the batteries onshore. The Euryalus Captain of the Afterguard, Thomas Pride, was awarded a Victoria Cross for his actions during one of the stormings at Shimonoseki. It was at Shimonoseki that Duncan Gordon Boyes won his Victoria Cross at the age of 17.

Fate 
Euryalus was paid off at Portsmouth on 23 September 1865. She was broken up in 1867.

References 
Notes

Bibliography
 Denney, John. Respect and Consideration: Britain in Japan 1853–1868 and beyond. Radiance Press (2011).

External links 
 

Frigates of the Royal Navy
1853 ships
Crimean War naval ships of the United Kingdom
Ships built in Chatham